French and Russian in Imperial Russia is a two-volume non-fiction series published in 2015 by Edinburgh University Press. The volumes were edited by Derek Offord, Lara Ryazanova-Clarke, Vladislav Rjéoutski, and Gesine Argent. The two volumes are about language usage in the Russian Empire.

References

External links
 

2015 non-fiction books
French language
Russian language
History books about the Russian Empire
Edinburgh University Press books